is an electronics company primarily known for its watches and is the core company of a Japanese global corporate group based in Nishitokyo, Tokyo, Japan. In addition to Citizen brand watches, it is the parent of American watch company Bulova, and is also known for manufacturing small electronics such as calculators.

History
The company was founded in 1930 by Japanese and Swiss investors. It took over Shokosha Watch Research Institute (founded in 1918) and some facilities of the assembly plant opened in Yokohama in 1912 by the Swiss watchmaker Rodolphe Schmid.

The brand Citizen was first registered in Switzerland by Schmid in 1918 for watches he sold in Japan. The development of this brand was supported in the 1920s by Count Gotō Shinpei with his hope that watches could become affordable to the general public. The growth of Citizen until World War II relied on technology transfer from Switzerland.

Products

Atomic timekeeping
Citizen launched the world's first multi-band atomic timekeeping watch in 1993 and has remained a pioneer of this field. Synchronized to atomic clocks, these watches are accurate to within one second in one hundred thousand years.

The Skyhawk A-T line features radio-controlled timekeeping. The watches can synchronize with radio clocks in Japan, North America, and Europe, automatically selecting the correct frequency by location. The watch actually tracks two time zones—home and world—but synchronizes to the 'home' zone. When traveling, the user may swap the 'home' and 'world' zones, thereby enabling proper time signal reception on a different continent while retaining the other time. The day, date, and daylight saving time settings are set automatically when the watch is synchronized. These features are comparable to the synchronization with atomic clocks found in Casio Wave Ceptor watches.

The Perpetual Chrono A-T synchronizes with the atomic clocks in Colorado or Germany, depending on signal strength and location, and incorporates Eco-Drive technology, so it does not require a battery.

Bulova UHF movement
In 2010, Miyota (Citizen Watch) of Japan introduced a newly developed movement (UHF 262 kHz) that uses a three-prong quartz crystal for the Precisionist or Accutron II line, a new type of quartz watch with ultra-high frequency (262.144 kHz) which is claimed to be accurate to +/− 10 seconds a year and has a smooth sweeping second hand rather than one that jumps each second.

Chronomaster 
Accurate to within five seconds per year, the Chronomaster line is unofficially the most accurate quartz-crystal watch ever made. They are currently sold only in the Japanese domestic market but can be obtained internationally if ordered online.

Contemporary watches
Citizen also produces the Independent Watches line, featuring a more modern, contemporary design than the traditional Citizen label. Depending on the market, these watches may be labelled "Secret", "Lighthouse" brands among others.

DCP clasp
The deployant clasp with a Push Button (DCP) is a clasp available for many Citizen watch bracelet bands. The clasp, as with the Calibre 8700, is also used with leather bands as if they were metal bracelet-style watchbands; however, when the clasp is fastened, the band appears to be a normal eye-hole and link pin leather watchband.

Diving watches (including the Fugu)

In 1959, Citizen launched the Parawater – Japan's first fully-waterproof wristwatch. It became the forerunner to Citizen's range of dive watches, subsequently (1982) called the Promaster Marine range. Also in 1982, Citizen launched the 1300m Professional Diver's watch – the world's most pressure-resistant wristwatch at the time.

But it was perhaps the Fugu that became Citizen's most iconic diver. With its launch in 1989, fans nicknamed it the Fugu, after the Japanese pufferfish. The watch's bezel has alternating smooth and serrated edges to provide a positive grip in wet conditions, with the shape inspired by the pufferfish. Citizen eventually adopted Fugu as the watch's official name, even engraving some models' casebacks with a pufferfish logo. And in 1993, the Comando Raggruppamento Subacquei e Incursori Teseo Tesei adopted the Fugu NY004 for official use. All Fugu models are certified to the ISO 6425 standard for reliability underwater, resistance to shocks and magnetism, water-tightness and thermal-shock resistance. The original Fugu series (NY004, NY008 and NY009) were criticised for their bezel action and lack of sapphire crystal. These issues were ultimately addressed by the NY011 series (launched in 2020). With a Miyota 8203 movement, Fugu automatic watches can be handwound – a significant advantage over their original competitor (Seiko's now discontinued SKX).

Among the world’s ISO-certified watches for professional diving, the Fugu remains the mechanical watch in continuous production for the longest.

Eco-Drive
Eco-Drive watches use a battery recharged by a solar panel hidden under the watch face. In the rare and discontinued Eco-Drive Duo series, the solar power was supplemented by an automatic quartz power source. One early model, called the Citizen Vitality, used the watch hands to drive a small electric generator, but was discontinued following complaints that the device could explode and cause wrist injuries. There was also an Eco-Drive Thermo model that exploited temperature differentials between the wearer's skin temperature and ambient temperature to recharge the battery. However, the only Eco-Drive system described on the Citizen Watch official website is the one depending solely on light to recharge. Features similar to the Eco-Drive have been developed by other manufacturers like Casio and Junghans. All Citizen Eco-Drive movements are made in Japan but the case or the bracelet may also be made in China.

Noblia 
In 1985 the Zen Noblia Ultra Slim watch was introduced as a model by Citizen. From 1986 to 1997 Citizen offered watches under the Noblia brand. These were in the high-priced segment and combined a traditional-classical design with modern quartz movements. Noblia was an outfitter and sponsor of the Louis Vuitton Cup and the Star North American Championship. Noblia was discontinued in 1997 after releasing a collection of ceramic clocks.

Q&Q SmileSolar 
Q&Q SmileSolar is a line of solar powered watches, which do not require a battery change. They are made of recycled materials and have a water resistant rating of 10 Bar. The line of watches also supports people by making a donation for each watch purchased.

Other products
Citizen also manufactures calculators and small electronic organizers. Some non-watch devices such as handheld televisions and computer printers, have been marketed under the Citizen brand name.

In the 1980s, a number of handheld electronic games were sold under the Q&Q brand.

In the early-mid 1990s, Citizen partnered with Compaq Computer Corporation to build notebook computers in Japan for the Japan and Far Eastern market to be sold under the Compaq name.

On January 10, 2008, Citizen bought the Bulova Watch Company for $250 million, making The Citizen Group the world's largest watchmaker.

In 2016, Citizen acquired the Swiss Frédérique Constant Group.

Corporate divisions
Japan CBM Corporation – Sales of timepieces, including the Q&Q brand.
Citizen Systems Japan Co., Ltd. – Sales of business and consumer electronic devices including calculators.
Citizen Miyota Co., Ltd. – Production of wristwatches, quartz crystal oscillators, electronic viewfinders, LCD back-light units, CCD/CMOS image sensors, ferroelectric micro LCDs, LCoS, high-density mounting equipment.
Citizen Fine Tech Co., Ltd. – Manufacturing and sales of electronic components (ceramic parts, quartz crystal oscillator chips, etc.).
Citizen Seimitsu Co., Ltd. – Manufacturing of watch movements, watch face components, automotive components, LCD cells, mini printers, measuring instruments, lubrication units, secondary machining LC lathes and glass scribers.
 Citizen Watch Company of America
 Vagary watches
 Bulova Watch Company
Alpina and Atelier de Monaco
 Frédérique Constant
  Campanola
  La Joux-Perret
  Arnold & Son

Sponsorships
Official timekeeper and official watch of the US Open tennis championships, from 1993 until 2017.
ISU – World Figure Skating Championships
Official timekeeping partner of Manchester United F.C.
Official partner of the Toronto Maple Leafs: during Leafs games at Scotiabank Arena, the scoreboard clock features Citizen branding.
Official timekeeper of Walt Disney World, Disneyland Resort, Tokyo Disney Resort, Disneyland Paris, Hong Kong Disneyland, and Shanghai Disney Resort

See also
 Seiko
 Orient
 Miyota

References 
Pierre-Yves Donzé, Industrial Development, Technology Transfer, and Global Competition: A history of the Japanese watch industry since 1850, Routledge, 2017.

External links

Citizen Watch Co., Ltd. (International Watch site)
Citizen Chronomaster Website
Citizen Watch UAE (Official Site in UAE)
Citizen Watch Oman (Official Site in Oman)

 
Japanese companies established in 1918
Manufacturing companies established in 1918
Electronics companies established in 1918
Multinational companies headquartered in Japan
Watchmaking conglomerates
Electronics companies of Japan
Watch manufacturing companies of Japan
Electronic calculator companies
Companies listed on the Tokyo Stock Exchange
Japanese brands
Nishitōkyō, Tokyo